Oxygnathus is a genus of beetles in the family Carabidae, containing the following species:

 Oxygnathus aboranus Andrewes, 1929
 Oxygnathus elongatus (Wiedemann, 1823)
 Oxygnathus ferrugineus Bulirsch, 2016
 Oxygnathus myanmarensis (Bulirsch, 2016)

References

Scaritinae